Ugo Ceresa (born February 5, 1915 in Casale Monferrato) was an Italian professional football player.

He played for 5 seasons (71 games) in the Serie A for U.S. Alessandria Calcio 1912 and A.S. Roma.

1915 births
Year of death missing
Italian footballers
Serie A players
Casale F.B.C. players
U.S. Alessandria Calcio 1912 players
A.S. Roma players
S.P.A.L. players
Association football goalkeepers